Maytê Piragibe (born Maytê Bernardes Rodrigues Piragibe on December 2, 1983 in Rio de Janeiro, Brazil) is a Brazilian actress and keyboardist.

In 2017, Piragibe won the first series of Dancing Brasil (season 1).

Television series
 Vitória (2014) – Renata
 José do Egito (2013) – Azenate 
 Promessas de Amor (2009) – Natália (Nati)
 Os Mutantes: Caminhos do Coração (2008) – Natália (Nati)
 Vidas Opostas (2006/2007) – Joana de Souza
 Cidadão Brasileiro (2005/2006) – Eleni Castro
 Como uma Onda (2004) – Júlia
 O Beijo do Vampiro (2002/2003) – Lucinha
 Cidade dos Homens (2003) – Maya
 Carga Pesada (2002) – Episode: "O Passado Me Condena"
 Malhação (2001/2002) – Cast Support

Movies
 Rinha (2008) – Fernanda

Theater
 Homem Age em... (2008)
 Mulheres Solteiras Procuram (2007)

References

External links
Rinha O Filme

1983 births
Living people
Brazilian telenovela actresses
Brazilian film actresses
Brazilian stage actresses